Split Decisions is a 1988 American crime drama sports film directed by David Drury and starring Craig Sheffer, Jeff Fahey and Gene Hackman.

Plot
On the east side of New York City, boxing trainer Danny McGuinn is trying to prepare one of his sons, Eddie, to earn a chance to fight in the Olympic Games, while his other son, Ray, has fallen in with shady men from organized crime. After Ray is killed, Eddie discovers that an opposing boxer, Pedroza, was involved in his brother’s death and challenges him to a bout in the hopes of securing revenge. Eddie defeats Pedroza after a hard-fought match, and the film ends with the remaining McGuinns celebrating victoriously.

Cast
 Craig Sheffer as Eddie McGuinn
 Jeff Fahey as Ray McGuinn
 Gene Hackman as Danny McGuinn
 John McLiam as Pop McGuinn
 Jennifer Beals as Barbara Uribe
 Eddie Velez as Julian 'The Snake' Pedroza
 Carmine Caridi as Lou Rubia
 James Tolkan as Benny Pistone
 David Labiosa as Rudy
 Harry Van Dyke as Douby
 Anthony Trujillo as Angel
 Victor Campos as Santiago
 Tom Bower as Detective Walsh
 Julius Harris as Tony Leone
 De'voreaux White as Coop
 Herb Muller as Mr. D.
 Cathleen A. Master as Pedroza's Girlfriend
 Rachel Renick as Red-Haired Woman
 Mark Dirkse as Thug #1
 George Robotham as Thug #2
 Pete Antico as Sparring Partner #1
 Mark Hicks as Sparring Partner #2
 Michael Adams as Sparring Partner #3
 Joe Godsen as Sparring Partner #4
 George P. Wilbur as Referee At Patty Flood

References

External links

1988 films
1988 crime drama films
1980s sports drama films
American boxing films
Films set in New York City
Films scored by Basil Poledouris
Films directed by David Drury
1980s English-language films
1980s American films